The Tai Chao-chuen Incident was one of the three major rebellions in Taiwan during the rule of the Qing dynasty. The rebellion lasted from 1862 to about 1865. The incident was caused by the suppression of the Tiandihui by the Qing government, and affected central Taiwan, spreading as far north as Dajia and as far south as Chiayi. Although the rebellion was led by Tai Chao-chuen (Taiwanese Hokkien: Tè Tiô-tshun), many rich and powerful people from all over Taiwan, like Lin Ri-cheng and Hung Tsung, were also involved.

At this time, the Qing dynasty was facing the Taiping Rebellion and therefore had little military force to spare to put down rebellion in Taiwan. In addition, many powerful local leaders participated in the rebellion, causing the Qing to initially rely on the militia of the Wufeng Lin and other clans. The rebellion was not brought under control until after the Qing had dispatched Ding Yuejian and Lin Wencha to suppress it in 1863, and did not end until 1865.

Once the Qing had succeeded, the Lin clan of Wufeng emerged as the most powerful in central Taiwan. This would eventually lead to conflicts between the clan and the Kuomintang government after the end of Japanese rule.

Origin
Tai Chao-chuen was originally a landowner in Sichangli (四張犁), Changhua (present-day Beitun District, Taichung). At one point he was an assistant to the military governor of central and northern Taiwan, though he lost it after being blackmailed by a high-ranking official. He succeeded his elder brother Tai Wan-guei as the head of his clan, and its associated Lord of the Land Society and Eight Trigram Society. He expanded these societies and converted them into branches of the Tiandihui while winning official approval by helping the government capture bandits, thereby expanding the power of the Tai clan.

Because of the rapid expansion of Tai Chao-chuen's power and rumors of his follower's lawlessness, the government decided to act against Tai Chao-chuen. On 3 April 1862, the Taiwan Military Director Kong Zhaoci arrived in Changhua, executed Hong Shi, the leader of the Eight Trigram Society, and then summoned former Changhua County magistrate and then-Tamsui Prefecture magistrate Qiu Yuejing to discuss mopping up anti-government forces. Consequently, Qiu Yuejin led 600 soldiers, in addition to supporting forces of 400 each led by Lin Dianguo and  Lin Richeng, to destroy the Tiandihui. However, on April 15, just as the government forces were going to battle with several thousand members of Tiandihui at Dadun, Lin Richeng defected and killed Qiu Yuejian. Lin Dianguo, seeing that the situation was not favorable, retreated to Azhaowu Village (present-day Wufeng District, Taichung City).

See also 
 Tiandihui
 Taiwan under Qing Dynasty rule

History of Taiwan
1863 in Taiwan
1864 in Taiwan
Organized crime events in Taiwan